Silicon Studio is a Japanese computer graphics technology company and video game developer based in Tokyo. As a technology company, Silicon Studio has produced several products in the 3D computer graphics field, including middleware software, such as a post-processing visual effects library called YEBIS, as well as general real-time graphics engines and game development engines, such as OROCHI and Mizuchi, a physically based rendering engine. As a video game developer, Silicon Studio has worked on different titles for several gaming platforms, most notably, the action-adventure game 3D Dot Game Heroes on the PlayStation 3, the two role-playing video games Bravely Default and Bravely Second: End Layer on the Nintendo 3DS, and Fantasica on the iOS and Android mobile platforms.

History
Silicon Studio was established in 2000. It was founded by Teruyasu Sekimoto, who was formerly the senior vice president of Silicon Graphics (SGI). Specializing from the start in rendering technology, research and development methods, post-processing visual effects, game content development, and online game solutions, Silicon Studio created four main studios to achieve the highest productivity in these areas. The research team at Silicon Studio developed several techniques related to fields in visual effects shown at the Computer Entertainment Developers Conference, such as post effect processing and global illumination. While traditionally a provider of middleware solutions for Japanese game developers, Silicon Studio has grown as an international company with a greater focus on the visibility of their products abroad.

Silicon Studio has partnerships with a number of companies, including French company Allegorithmic, Canadian company Audiokinetic, British company Stainless Games, Italian companies such as Kunos Simulazioni and Milestone, American companies such as Microsoft and Pixar, and Japanese companies such as Bandai Namco, DeNA, Dimps, FromSoftware, Idea Factory, Koei Tecmo, Marvelous, Sega, and Sony Computer Entertainment. Silicon Studio has also partnered with the following companies: Vivante, OTOY, Square Enix, and Matchlock.

In February 2015, Silicon Studio was listed on the Tokyo Stock Exchange Mothers market.

Video games
Games developed by Silicon Studio:

Middleware

Bishamon
– Bishamon is a particle effect authoring tool and runtime library that works for many gaming platforms. It is developed by a partner company and is integrated with the Orochi3 game development engine.

Motion Portrait
– Motion Portrait is a technology tool that can automatically animate a portrait. It supports both regular camera photos or non-realistic character drawings.

YEBIS
Development for YEBIS originally began some time around 2004. Notable video games that utilize YEBIS include:

Software that support YEBIS include:

Substance Designer 4.3
Substance Painter
Luminous Studio
Modo
OTOY real-time path tracing engine

YEBIS 2

YEBIS 2 is a post-processing middleware solution that allows developers to create high-quality lens-simulation optical effects.

In June 2013, Silicon Studio announced that their next post-processing middleware solution, YEBIS 2, would be available for game developers on the PlayStation 4 and Xbox One development network. At the E3 Expo 2013, Square Enix’s tech demo Agni’s Philosophy was shown using YEBIS 2 post-processing effects.

In August 2013, the YEBIS 2 tech demo "Rigid Gems" was featured in Google’s official unveiling of the Nexus 7 mobile tablet. YEBIS has also been used for the Xbox One launch title, Fighter Within. In May 2014, Silicon Studio announced that their YEBIS 2 middleware was being utilized in the MotoGP 14 video racing game, developed by Milestone for PlayStation 4. YEBIS 2 is also utilized by Square Enix's Luminous Studio engine, and the action role-playing game Final Fantasy XV which runs on the Luminous Studio engine. In 2014, Allegorithmic announced that it had integrated YEBIS 2 with software such as Substance Designer 4.3 and Substance Painter, which are supported by The Foundry's Modo software. OTOY has also been using YEBIS for their real-time path tracing engine on PC.

In 2015, Geomerics announced that it has integrated YEBIS 3 with the Forge lighting tool for the Enlighten 3 software.

Engines

OROCHI3
– Orochi3 is an all-in-one game development engine. It supports PlayStation 4, Xbox One, PlayStation 3, PlayStation Vita, Xbox 360 and PC. It was used by Bandai Namco Entertainment's fighting game Rise of Incarnates. An earlier version of Orochi was also used by Square Enix's third-person shooter arcade game Gunslinger Stratos in 2012.

Mizuchi

A new real-time graphics engine that debuted in 2014, compatible with the PC and PlayStation 4 platforms. It is called Mizuchi, with the full title, Mizuchi: The Cutting-Edge Real-Time Rendering Engine. It is intended to be used for various different applications, including video game development, films, architectural and automobile visualization, and academic research.

In September 2014, a tech demo running on the engine, called "Museum", was revealed. It received a positive reception for the high visual quality of its real-time graphics. In December 2014, Silicon Studio announced the Mizuchi engine will be compatible with the PC at 60 frames per second and the PlayStation 4 at 30 frames per second.

Stride

Stride, formerly known as Xenko and before that as Paradox, is a game development framework and C# game engine with an asset pipeline and a cross-platform runtime supporting iOS, Android, Windows UWP, Linux, and PlayStation 4. It was made free and open-source software in October 2014. Xenko beta version 1.8x was then released finally out of beta in February 2017. In April 2020, engine was renamed to Stride.

References

External links 
 

Japanese companies established in 2000
3D computer graphics
Free and open-source software
Software companies based in Tokyo
Software companies established in 2000
Video game companies established in 2000
Video game companies of Japan
Video game development companies